Miltochrista mesortha is a moth of the family Erebidae. It was described by George Hampson in 1898. It is found in Assam, India.

References

 

mesortha
Moths described in 1898
Moths of Asia